Saša Obradović (Anglicized: Sasha Obradovic; , ; born 29 January 1969) is a Serbian professional basketball coach and former player. He is currently the head coach for AS Monaco of the French LNB Pro A

During his playing career, he won FIBA Korać Cup in 1995, three YUBA League championships and a Yugoslav Cup, as well as German League title and three German Cup tournaments.

A Yugoslav international, Obradović won three FIBA EuroBasket gold medals (1995, 1997, 2001), and a bronze medal in 1999. He also won the gold medal at the 1998 FIBA World Championship and the Olympic silver medal at the 1996 Olympics.

Obradović finished his playing career in 2005 with RheinEnergie Köln. The following season, he became their head coach and won the German League in his rookie season. In the 2011–12 season, he coached Donetsk to their first-ever Ukrainian Super League title. Thereafter, he coached Alba Berlin for four seasons, winning three German Cup tournaments. In 2018 Obradović won the Russian Cup with Lokomotiv Kuban, earning the EuroCup Coach of the Year award.

Playing career
As a professional basketball player, Obradović played for Crvena zvezda, Limoges, Alba Berlin, Virtus Roma, Budućnost Podgorica and RheinEnergie Köln, until his retirement in 2005.

In April 2001, during his time with Budućnost, Obradović got into a fistfight with teammate Milenko Topić, during a practice session, and got suspended by the club. They soon parted ways.

He is cited by former teammate, Marcin Gortat, as his mentor and a figure that helped develop Gortat as a player and person.

National team career
After the lifting of sanctions against FR Yugoslavia, the national team was given the opportunity to qualify for the 1995 FIBA European Championship in Greece through the Additional qualifying round in Sofia, Bulgaria. Obradović had a key role in a 93–87 overtime win over Bulgaria when he scored the team-high 16 points and helped the team to qualify for Championship. Afterwards, he was a member of the national team led by head coach Dušan Ivković that won the gold medal at the 1995 Championship. The team finished the tournament undefeated at 9–0. Over nine tournament games, Obradović averaged 6.3 points, one rebound, and 1.9 assists per game.

Obradović was a member of the national team led by head coach Željko Obradović that won the silver medal at the 1996 Olympics in Atlanta, United States. Yugoslavia lost to the United States in the gold medal game. He recorded his tournament-high with 18 points in a 91–68 win over Australia in the Preliminary round game 2. Over eight tournament games, Obradović averaged 6.2 points, one rebound, and 1.9 assists per game.

Obradović won his second gold medal at the 1997 FIBA European Championship in Spain. Over nine tournament games, he averaged 5.1 points and 2.3 assists per game. The team went on to win their second straight gold medal, defeating Italy in the final game. In the next year, Obradović was a member of the Yugoslavia team that won the gold medal at the FIBA World Championship in Greece. He scored his tournament-high with 18 points, making 4 threes out of 4, in 19 minutes in a 99–54 win over Japan. Over nine tournament games, he averaged 9 points, 1.1 rebounds, and 1.3 assists per game.

Obradović won the bronze medal at the 1999 FIBA European Championship in France averaging 9.2 points, 1.2 rebounds, and 1.8 assists per game over five tournament games. He missed three all three games in the Knockout stage due to injury. In the next year, Obradović played at his second Olympics. Over seven Olympic tournament games in Australia, he averaged 6.6 points, 1.6 rebounds, and 1.7 assists per game.

Obradović was a member of the Yugoslavia team led by head coach Svetislav Pešić that won the gold medal at the 2001 FIBA European Championship in Turkey. It was his third gold medal at European Championships (nowadays known as EuroBasket). The team finished the tournament undefeated at 6–0, defeating Turkey in the final game. Over six tournament games, he averaged 4.3 points, 1.7 assists, and 1.7 steals per game. After the tournament he announced his retirement from international basketball at 32.

Coaching career
Immediately after his retirement as a basketball player, Obradović began his coaching career and was appointed the head coach for RheinEnergie Köln, where he served until 2008. He also coached at Kyiv, Turów Zgorzelec and Donetsk. After coaching those teams, Obradović joined Alba Berlin in 2012.

On 23 May 2016, it was announced that Obradović would leave Alba.

In November 2016, Obradović signed to be the head coach for the Russian club Lokomotiv Kuban of the VTB United League. He left Lokomotiv Kuban on 4 November 2018.

In February 2019, Obradović was named the head coach for AS Monaco of the LNB Pro A. In June 2020, he parted ways with Monaco.

Obradović got his first taste of the NBA through the Summer League coaching stints with the Brooklyn Nets, the Atlanta Hawks and the San Antonio Spurs.

On 10 June 2020, Crvena zvezda named Obradović as the new head coach. After having only 5 wins in 16 Euroleague games, he parted ways with Crvena Zvezda on 24 December 2020.

On December 13, 2021, he has signed with AS Monaco of the French LNB Pro A.

Career awards and achievements
As player:
3× Yugoslav League Champion: 1993, 1994, 2001
FIBA Korać Cup Champion: 1995
FIBA European Selection: 1995
FIBA EuroStar: 1996
2× German League Champion: 1997, 2006
3× German Cup Winner: 1997, 2004, 2005
Yugoslav Cup Winner: 2001

As head coach:
National Championships:
German League Champion: 2006
Ukrainian Super League Champion: 2012
National Cups:
4× German Cup Winner: 2007, 2013, 2014, 2016
Russian Cup Winner: 2018
Individual:
FIBA EuroChallenge All-Star Game: 2006
German League Coach of the Year: 2015
 EuroCup Basketball Coach of the Year: 2018

See also
 List of Olympic medalists in basketball
 List of KK Crvena zvezda players with 100 games played

Notes

References

External links

 Saša Obradović Coach Profile at euroleague.net
 Saša Obradović Player Profile at euroleague.net
 Saša Obradović Player Profile at fiba.com
 Saša Obradović Player Profile at fibaeurope.com
 Saša Obradović Player Profile at legabasket.it 

1969 births
Living people
1998 FIBA World Championship players
Alba Berlin basketball coaches
Alba Berlin players
AS Monaco Basket coaches
Basketball players at the 1996 Summer Olympics
Basketball players at the 2000 Summer Olympics
Basketball players from Belgrade
FIBA EuroBasket-winning players
FIBA World Championship-winning players
KK Budućnost players
KK Crvena zvezda head coaches
KK Crvena zvezda players
Limoges CSP players
Medalists at the 1996 Summer Olympics
Olympic basketball players of Yugoslavia
Olympic medalists in basketball
Olympic silver medalists for Serbia and Montenegro
Pallacanestro Virtus Roma players
RheinStars Köln coaches
PBC Lokomotiv-Kuban coaches
Point guards
Serbian men's basketball coaches
Serbian men's basketball players
Serbian expatriate basketball people in France
Serbian expatriate basketball people in Germany
Serbian expatriate basketball people in Poland
Serbian expatriate basketball people in Italy
Serbian expatriate basketball people in Monaco
Serbian expatriate basketball people in Montenegro
Serbian expatriate basketball people in Russia
Serbian expatriate basketball people in Ukraine
Shooting guards